Siam Ahmed is a Bangladeshi television and film actor. He made his debut as Afnan in a Bangladeshi telefilm Bhalobasha 101.

He is best known for his debut role in the film PoraMon 2. He is also well known for his various roles in Bengali TV dramas. He won Bangladesh National Film Award for Best Actor for his role in the film Bishwoshundori (2020).

Early life 
He SSC passed from Motijheel Model School and College. Ahmed passed his higher secondary graduation from Notre Dame College, Dhaka. He completed diploma and LLB Hons from University of London. He did Bar Professional Training Course (BPTC) from Lincoln's Inn. He also did PGDL from Northumbria University Newcastle

Career 
Ahmed started his career as a model for Airtel Bangladesh. His first drama was "Bhalobasha 101" by Redoan Rony. After that he acted, one by one, in many TV dramas including Megh Enechi Bheja, Happy Ending, X factor Reload, Tomar Amar Prem etc. He has been praised a lot for his short film "Bokhate". In 2018 he joined Dhallywood and his debut movie was PoraMon 2. He also performed in some music videos like Bondhurey, Cholna Sujon, Tumi Chaile, Deyale Deyale etc. He also worked in Hoichoi web film "Lilith" starring Masuma Rahman Nabila.

Personal life
Ahmed is married to Shamma Rushafy Abantee since December 2018.

Siam has a son named Zoraiz Ahmed Zayn

Filmography

Film

Television

Web series

Short films

Awards

References

External links
 
 
 

Living people
Notre Dame College, Dhaka alumni
University of Dhaka alumni
Alumni of the University of London
Bangladeshi male film actors
Bangladeshi male television actors
Barristers and advocates
Bangladeshi barristers
Best Actor National Film Award (Bangladesh) winners
1990 births